Muyinga is a city located in northern Burundi.  It is the capital city of Muyinga Province. It lies at an altitude of 1731 m and has a population of 100,715.

Populated places in Burundi